Montisi is an Italian village in the municipality of Montalcino, Province of Siena, Tuscany. It sits on a hill on the boundary between the Val d'Orcia and the Crete Senesi.

History 

Montisi has ancient roots: in fact it arose in the Middle Ages on the site of an ancient Etruscan necropolis. In 1291, the Lord of Montisi Simon Cacciaconti degli Scialenga recaptured the village, destroying most homes and robbing all the farms. But when he died in 1295, left most of his possessions to the Spedale di Santa Maria della Scala, who built a grange.

At the end of the 14th century, Montisi became an independent comune and so remained until 1777, when it became at the first a frazione of Trequanda, and, after various vicissitudes due to the water supply, of San Giovanni d'Asso.

The village

The contrade 
Montisi is divided into four contrade:
Castello, or the area of the medieval village. The colors of its flag are white, yellow and blue;
Piazza, located near the Castle. The colors of its flag are orange, white and green and in its coat of arms appear the "Colonna" (a little obelisk) and aspindle;
San Martino, it's in the northeastern part of the village. The colors of its flag are red, white and blue;
Torre, takes its name from the Tower of the Grange, which was destroyed in 1944. The colors of its flag are red, white and black.

The monuments 
The façade

The Grange of Santa Maria della Scala is the most important monument in Montisi. It was built by the Spedale in 14th century and, when it sold the Grange, the farm was bought by Jacopo Mannucci Benincasa, Secretary of the Grand Duke of Tuscany Peter Leopold. On 30 June 1944, retreating German troops blew up the tower. Currently, the Grange is a private home and a farmhouse.
The building is built around two main courtyards, separate from what was once an open loggia. In the southern, there is a small 19th century theater, the result of a radical restoration work in the early 21st century. Now the theater is used for shows and comedies.

Pieve of the Santissima Annunziata

The Pieve of the Santissima Annunziata is the parish church of Montisi. It was built with the contemporary church of Santo Stefano in Cennano, in the nearby village of Castelmuzio, in the thirteenth century in Romanesque style, but it has undergone over the centuries various restorations and alterations. In the eighteenth century the church was restored in Baroque style by the Bishop of Pienza Septimius Cinughi and was re-dedicated – as a plaque to the left of the entrance. The last major intervention began in mid-twentieth century, when the parson Elio Benvenuti to the church expanded by building a new apse and the side chapel. The Romanesque facade still retains the look with two windows on the sides of the portal and the masonry blocks of tuff. The interior, however, is in Renaissance style and the nave is divided into four bays by three sets of three arches supported by marble columns. The church has many works of art such as the altar piece "Madonna enthroned with Saints Paul, James, Peter and Louis" by Neroccio di Bartolomeo de' Landi, and the "Crucifixion" painted in the mid-fourteenth century .

Curacy of Saints Flora and Lucilla

The church of Saints Flora and Lucilla, also called "la Cura" because at one time ruled by a curate, is the second most important church in the village. It was the first church in the village to be built in the Middle Ages and has been completely restored in Baroque style in 1732 at the behest of the Bishop of Pienza Septimius Cinughi. The church, then home to several fraternities, was enlarged in the mid-nineteenth century thanks to funding family Mannucci Benincasa: were made in the transept, the new apse, the main altar, the sacristy and the bell tower. It was also donated the pipe organ located on the cantoria, not currently accessible and free of much of the material sound technician. The interior has a nave with four altars along the walls and transept formed by the chapels dedicated at the Sacred Heart (right chapel) and at Our Lady of Lourdes (left chapel). In the chancel is the altar, decorated with neo-Gothic paintings and large crucifix donated in 1944. Behind it, in the apse, there is a French harmonium. The church was left abandoned for about twenty years and recently reopened; now it is used every year for master classes in harpsichord by the Piccola Accademia di Montisi.

Oratory of Saint Anthony of the Brotherhood of Blessed Sacrament

The oratory of the Confraternity (compagnia) of the Blessed Sacrament was built in the 15th century. The facade is simple with a central Rose window. The interior, restored in Baroque style in 1616 and 1773, has a single nave with three bays. During meetings, members of the brotherhood occupy benches along the side walls with a simple balustrade painted wood. At the apse, the single altar houses a painting of the Last Supper by Giovanni di Giovanni and beneath, a processional statue of the "Dead Christ". The fifteenth-century crypt, the sacristy and the meeting room are used as a Museum of Sacred Art, with furnishings and objects from the oratory and the church of Saints Flora and Lucilla. In the crypt, located beneath the nave of the church, there is a fresco depicting a Crucifixion by an unknown medieval artist,. In the meeting room, which is above the sacristy, are preserved ancient missals, the processional statue of Our Lady of Seven Sorrows and a banner painted with the symbol of brotherhood.

Mannucci Benincasa Palace

The Mannucci Benincasa Palace is located in the Piazza Contrada, on Via Umberto I. It was built by the family Mannucci Benincasa in the eighteenth century as his palace and in the manner of a tower house. It was later expanded in the nineteenth century: the porch in blocks of tuff, which was on the left, was incorporated in the building and was also expanded from the part that faced the country with the construction of the garden. The facade on Via Umberto I is characterized by the great portal in solid wood doors with wrought iron frame with carved leaves and marble ashlar. The lobby of the building, long and low, is covered by a barrel vault with frescoes lowered monochrome. In the stairwell, located down the hall and characterized by circular ramp, there is a family crest Mannucci Benincasa glazed and painted earthenware. On the occasion of the Giostra di Simone and the Festa dell'Olio Novo, held in the hall of exhibitions of local handicrafts.

Civic Tower and the "Colonna"

Along the slope that connects via Umberto I, the town's main street, with the Castello's Contrada, there are two symbolic monuments of the country: the Civic Tower and the "Colonna". The Civic Tower was built in the nineteenth century and was renovated in winter 2007. The building, visible from both the country and from dontorni for his height, is partly covered with cream-colored plaster, even in part with the stone walls (especially the corners). The tower is characterized by two clock dials with Roman numerals and by the metal structure, located on the top, that holds the bell that rings every half-hour. The Colonna, however, despite its name, is a small obelisk made of four overlapping blocks of stone. It was donated as a vow to the Madonna in the second half of the nineteenth century; in fact, within a small niche closed grate, there is a sacred effigy of Mary. Despite being very close to each other, the two monuments belong to two different districts: the Colonna is in Piazza's Contrada but the Civic Tower is in Castello's Contrada.

Folklore

Every year, on the afternoon of the Sunday closest to 5 August, the feast of Our Lady of the Snows, there is the traditional Giostra di Simone, attended the four quarters of the country, which includes a parade with costumed along the way main race of the flag and a carousel horseback in which you must thread the campanella, a ring placed on the shoulder of the Buratto, a dummy which turns on itself. The festival ends with a song of thanksgiving in the sanctuary of Our Lady of the Snows.
In addition, during the year, are held in Montisi three other folk events:
 The Festa dell'Olio Novo (English: New Oil Festival'') (1–2 November), during which you can visit the various mills in the area and taste and buy the new oil and other products;
 The procession of Corpus Christi (Sunday after the feast of Corpus Christi), during which, after Mass, is carried in procession through the streets of the consecrated host country;
 Procession of the Dead Christ (Good Friday evening), which is carried in procession along Via Umberto I, the statue of the Dead Christ, which is usually located beneath the altar of the church of the Society.

External links
 Travel information about the area can be found here.

 
Frazioni of Montalcino